Shanghai Pudong Airport APM is an automated people mover in the Pudong International Airport. In the initial phase, there are two lines, each connecting a terminal building and a satellite hall. The two lines are planned to be connected after the completion of Terminal 3 in the future. The system uses Type A (Chinese: :zh:A型车) metro trains, currently in a 4-car configuration, with conditions reserved for a 5-car configuration across the fleet.

Route
The east line of the APM starts from Terminal 2 to S2 Satellite Hall, and extends to the T3 terminal station in the long term. They are all platforms on one island side on the first basement level.

The APM West Line starts from Terminal 1 to S1 Satellite Hall, and extends to the T3 terminal station in the long-term. They are all platforms on the one-island side of the basement level.

Both S1 and S2 are connected together and are since the opening in September 2019 connected by a  underground automated people mover to the current T1 and T2 terminals operated by Shanghai Keolis for 20 years, including the East Line and the West Line.

Technology
It is equipped with CBTC technology, which enables operations at higher frequencies and speeds safely - with or without a driver. In the case of the Pudong airport line, this metro will have a driver on-board (Grade of Operation 2). The service headway at peak hours will be 4 to 5 minutes and 10 minutes during off-peak hours. 

FITSCO signaling realizes the functions of stable arrival, precise alignment, parking, unattended automatic return, automatic shuttle mode and unattended automatic storage in the main line under ATO control. The train is sent to the storage area to sleep in an unmanned and fully automated way, it is woken up remotely on ATS, runs the pre-departure test, and automatically enters the service platform to reduce the operation intensity and meet the requirements of airport security management.

Rolling stock (vehicles)

The main line supplies power to the third rail, and in the depot power is supplied using overhead wires. Each train has four compartments, two for domestic flight passengers and the rest for international flight travelers. There are isolation doors between the carriages to separate the two types of passengers, and the platform is also equipped with physical barriers. In order to prevent passengers from going to the wrong boarding gate, there are ticket inspectors in the passenger compartments of passengers going to the satellite hall to take international flights. Passengers must present their boarding pass with the initials "G" or "H" at the boarding gate before they can board the car. Passengers taking domestic flights do not have ticket inspectors, and even if they go to the wrong satellite hall boarding gate, they can take the APM back to the terminal.

Screens for flight information and luggage racks have been installed. It is designed to transport 9,000 passengers per hour during peak periods with an interval of about two minutes. A ride between a terminal and its satellite takes 2.5 minutes. It adopts double-line shuttle operation mode.

References

Airport people mover systems
People mover systems in China
2019 establishments in China
Transport in Shanghai
Pudong